Isaac Ben Walid, also known by his epithet The Fair, is considered one of the greatest Moroccan rabbis. He served as the rabbi of Tetuan for approximately 40 years. He also authored a two-volume book on the history of Jews in Tetuan, entitled So Spoke Isaac (ויאמר יצחק). In 1860, he also founded the first ever school of the Alliance Israélite Universelle, located in Tetuan.

Biography 
He was born in Tetuan in 1777 to Rabbi Shem Tov and into a family of rabbis. He was named after his grandfather, Rabbi Isaac.

Isaac's father died when he was young, and his family became poor. Isaac displayed great knowledge of the Torah and Halakha, or Jewish rabbinical law, and the rabbis considered him full of potential.

He married a woman from a family of rabbis. She gave birth to his eldest son before passing away shortly thereafter. Bengualid remarried a rabbi named Widal Pipas, who gave birth to 10 children that studied the Torah and became rabbis.

He spent most of his life teaching students the Torah. His mausoleum is located in Hay Al-Quds, formerly the Tetuan's Jewish quarter, and it hosts a memorial celebration, or hillula, annually.

See also
Hiloula of Rabbi Isaac Ben Walid

Resources 

18th-century Moroccan rabbis
People from Tétouan
All stub articles
1870 deaths
1777 births
19th-century Moroccan rabbis